This is a list of miscellaneous ships of the Ottoman Navy:

Steamer (Vapur)

Transporter / Depot ship

Tugboat (Römorkör)

Tugboat used as water depot or water tanker ship

Sources

External links 
Directory of Tugs of the Ottoman Navy between 1828 - 1923, Hans van der Ster Marcol production

Naval ships of the Ottoman Empire
Lists of ships of the Ottoman Empire